Sydney Cross Harland  (1891–1982) was a British agricultural botanist with considerable international experience. His area of expertise was especially in the growing of cotton.

Early life and education
Sydney Cross Harland was born in Snainton in Yorkshire on 19 June 1891, the son of Erasmus Harland and his wife Eliza. He was educated at the municipal secondary school in Scarborough, North Yorkshire.

He studied Sciences with a focus upon Geology at King's College London graduating BSc in 1912 and gaining a doctorate (DSc) in 1919.

Career
In 1922 he left Britain to take up a teaching role in the Danish-owned island of St Croix (now part of the US Virgin Islands). In 1923 he became Professor of Botany at the Imperial College of Tropical Agriculture in Trinidad and Tobago. In 1926 he also became Director of the Cotton Research Station in Trinidad, continuing in this role until 1935. In 1940 he moved to Peru as Director of the Institute of Genetics within the National Agricultural Society of Peru.

He returned to Britain in 1949 as a Reader in Botany at the University of Manchester being made the George Harrison Professor of Botany at the University of Manchester the following year, 1950, and retaining this post until 1958, when he was subsequently made an emeritus professor.

He was made a Fellow of the Royal Society in 1943. In 1951 he was elected a Fellow of the Royal Society of Edinburgh. His proposers were Claude Wardlaw, Herbert Graham Cannon, William Black and William Robb.

In 1952, a paper published by Kathleen Basford on a cross species of Fuchsia which indicated the species had existed before the separation of landmasses 20-30 million years ago, spurred him to offer her a job at the university. The two worked together at the university, including traveling to Peru together to breed maize.

Personal life
He married Emily Wilson Cameron in 1915. They had two daughters, but divorced and in 1934 he married Olive Sylvia Atteck, from a wealthy Trinidad family. Their son became a Professor of Child Health in the West Indies. Another son of his is psychologist Richard Lynn.

He died in Snainton on 8 November 1982.

Publications
The Genetics of Cotton (1939)

References

1891 births
1982 deaths
Alumni of King's College London
Fellows of the Royal Society
Fellows of the Royal Society of Edinburgh
Academics of the Victoria University of Manchester
English botanists
People from Snainton